Isopropamide (R79) is a long-acting anticholinergic drug. It is used in the treatment of peptic ulcers and other gastrointestinal disorders involving hyperacidity (gastrointestinal acidosis) and hypermotility. Chemically, it contains a quaternary ammonium group. It is most often provided as an iodide salt, but is also available as a bromide or chloride salt. It was discovered at Janssen Pharmaceutica in 1954.

References

Further reading 

 
 

Muscarinic antagonists
Quaternary ammonium compounds
Carboxamides
Janssen Pharmaceutica
Belgian inventions
Diisopropylamino compounds